Katarzyna Weiglowa (Wajglowa) (German: Katherine Weigel; given erroneously in a Polish source of 17c. as Vogel, and known in many English sources as Catherine Vogel) (circa 1460 – April 19, 1539), was a Polish woman who was burned at the stake for apostasy. She converted from Roman Catholicism to Judaism or to Judaizing nontrinitarianism, and was executed in Kraków after she refused to call Jesus Christ the Son of God. She is regarded by Unitarians and Jews (among others) as a martyr.

She was born Katarzyna Zalasowska, a daughter of Stanisław Zalasowski and widow of Melchior Weigel, merchant and councilman of Kraków.

Accusation of apostasy
In the Jewish Encyclopedia she appears under a variant spelling of her maiden name as Catherine Zelazowska. Little is known about her life before 1529–1530 when she appeared several times before an episcopal court in Kraków, and refused to abjure "mistakes of the Jewish faith". Catherine probably started professing nontrinitarianism under the influence of writings by Martin Borrhaus, published in 1527. Jewish Encyclopedia suggested that she followed the example of a daughter of a Mikołaj II Radziwiłł and embraced Judaism. She tried to promote her views during the Sejm debates in 1538–1539.

At the age of 70, Catherine was imprisoned  in Kraków under the charge of confessing "heresy" by the order of Piotr Gamrat, bishop of Kraków, who had accused her before Queen Bona.

Execution

She admitted professing the unity of God, and rejecting the notion of "Holy Trinity". She spent 10 years in prison, before she was burnt alive at the stake on the Little Market place in Kraków at the age of 80. According to written testimonies, even on the stake she refused to abjure her faith which she confessed loudly until the end. Because of her Nontrinitarian views Catherine was not defended by Polish Protestants. However, after her death believers from different branches of Protestantism have often referred to her as a victim of religious persecutions and a martyr.

Aftermath

The burning of Catherine was a surprising incident in Poland, which, in the 16th century, ranked among the countries with the highest degree of religious tolerance.

After her death her fate faded into obscurity in Poland. The Sejm in 1539 did not take a stance on her execution, and mentions of her have been preserved mainly in Protestant polemical writings and in Judeophobic literature from the 17th century.

References

Converts to Judaism from Roman Catholicism
1539 deaths
16th-century converts to Judaism
16th-century Polish Jews
Jewish martyrs
Executed Polish people
Executed Polish women
People executed by Poland by burning
People executed by the Polish–Lithuanian Commonwealth
People executed for blasphemy
People executed for heresy
Polish Roman Catholics
Polish Unitarians
Year of birth unknown
16th-century Polish women
16th-century executions by Poland
Jewish women